Provincial Trunk Highway 60 (PTH 60) is a provincial highway in the Canadian province of Manitoba. It runs from PTH 10 to PTH 6. Much of its length runs adjacent to the north shore of Lake Winnipegosis.

The route connects PTH 6 to PTH 10 and Flin Flon. The speed limit is 100 km/h (62 mph).

The highway is designated as a northern/remote route within Canada's National Highway System.

060